Stephen Fuhr (born May 27, 1969) is a Canadian Liberal politician, who represented the riding of Kelowna—Lake Country in Canada's 42nd Parliament.

Fuhr was born in Edmonton and grew up in Kamloops. He attended Trinity Western University, earning a diploma in aviation technology, and subsequently joined what was then the Canadian Forces Air Command (now the Royal Canadian Air Force). As a pilot in the RCAF he served in several capacities to include flight training and standards.  He also served as an operational fighter pilot and was involved in CF-18 fleet management.  Fuhr was qualified as both a NORAD and NATO fighter operations evaluator and received a Commanders Commendation for his role as a Canadian NORAD Region (CANR) Fighter Officer (FO). He also received a Chief of the Air Staff Commendation for his part in regenerating Canada's tactical air control party (TACP) for the conflict in Afghanistan.  In his final year in the RCAF Fuhr led the team that restructured the course delivery method of the Canadian Forces Instrument Check Pilot School (ICPS).

He retired from the RCAF in 2009, and from 2009 to 2012 worked as an executive at SkyTrac Systems. Prior to his election, he was working as a private pilot and was qualified as a captain on several different aircraft types.

Fuhr, who described himself as a "lifelong Conservative," wrote in an op-ed for HuffPost Canada that he grew increasingly dissatisfied with the Conservatives from 2010 onward. He started moving away from the Conservatives after the Stephen Harper government tried to sole-source new F-35 jets that he claimed were unreliable and expensive. This and other moves by Harper led Fuhr to believe that the Harper government had "completely lost sight of everything it said it stood for." "

Fuhr is the first Liberal MP to represent Kelowna since 1972, and his election was seen as an upset. He is also the first Liberal to represent a riding in the British Columbia Interior since 1979.

Fuhr was elected to chair the Standing Committee on National Defence on February 18, 2016.

Electoral record

References

1969 births
Liberal Party of Canada MPs
Living people
Members of the House of Commons of Canada from British Columbia
People from Kelowna
Politicians from Edmonton
Royal Canadian Air Force officers
Trinity Western University alumni
Canadian aviators
21st-century Canadian politicians